Timothy John Matthews (1907 - 1991) was the ninth Bishop of Quebec.

He was educated at Bishop's College School and Bishop's University, Lennoxville and ordained in 1933. After curacies at Viking and Edson he held incumbencies at Coaticook and Lake St John. He was Archdeacon of Gaspé from 1952 to 1957; and then of St Francis until his elevation to the episcopate in 1971. He resigned his see in 1977.

References

See also 
List of Bishop's College School alumni

1907 births
1991 deaths
Bishop's University alumni
Anglican archdeacons in North America
Anglican bishops of Quebec
20th-century Anglican Church of Canada bishops
Bishop's College School alumni
Anglophone Quebec people